This is a list of railway roundhouses.  A roundhouse is a building used for servicing locomotives, large, circular or semicircular structures often located adjacent to or surrounding turntables.

Australia

Goulburn Rail Heritage Centre located, Goulburn, features the largest heritage based operating roundhouse in NSW and displays the historic transition from steam to diesel operations
 The Junee roundhouse, built in 1947, is being shared between the Junee Roundhouse Railway Museum, and the Junee Railway Workshop, the latter actively rebuilding, and servicing locomotives 
Steamtown Peterborough Railway Preservation Society, a railway museum, Peterborough, South Australia, includes a roundhouse
Valley Heights Locomotive Depot Heritage Museum, Valley Heights, 75 km west of Sydney, contains the oldest surviving roundhouse in Australia
Broadmeadow Locomotive Depot, Newcastle, Broadmeadow, New South Wales, the 1948 vintage No. 2 roundhouse survives, a second roundhouse dating from 1924 was also on the site but it was demolished in 1990
The Collie Roundhouse in Collie Western Australia is rundown and not in use
The Lachlan Valley Railway is based at Cowra roundhouse
Pacific National use the remains of the roundhouse at Werris Creek, New South Wales
Gemco Rail use the roundhouse at Parkes, New South Wales
The roundhouse at Casino, New South Wales still stands although currently out of use

Canada
Incomplète.

Alberta

Hanna, Alberta Roundhouse was designated a Provincial Historic Resource in August 2015, Hanna Roundhouse Society purchased the roundhouse, exterior turntable, and 9.97 acres in September 2013
Heritage Park Roundhouse, Calgary, Alberta. Built to store the park's collection of railway equipment.
Strathcona Roundhouse, Edmonton, Alberta. Built and used by the Canadian Pacific Railway, it is the last roundhouse in Alberta still in use. Once part of a much larger structure, only one stall remains. No turntable.
Roundhouse, Big Valley, Alberta - preserved roundhouse and turntable ruins

British Columbia

 Vancouver Roundhouse, now the Roundhouse Community Arts and Recreation Centre, Vancouver, British Columbia
 Roundhouse, Squamish, British Columbia - reproduction railway museum roundhouse and event center, West Coast Railway Heritage Park
 The Esquimalt and Nanaimo Railway Roundhouse in Victoria, British Columbia
 →

Ontario

John Street Roundhouse, Toronto, Ontario, which is now the Steam Whistle Brewing, was formerly a Canadian Pacific Railway steam locomotive repair facility
CNR Spadina Roundhouse was also in Toronto until it was demolished in 1986.
Michigan Central Railroad Roundhouse, 240 Waterloo Street, London, Ontario, constructed in 1887 to service steam locomotives and ceased operations in the late 1890s, restored as a digital media centre
Roundhouse in Hornepayne, Ontario made by the Canadian National Railway
Roundhouse, Capreol, Ontario - roundhouse structure remains but turntable removed
Roundhouse, Chapleau, Ontario - turntable and roundhouse ruins

Quebec

Roundhouse, Charny, Quebec - intact 39 stall Joffre Roundhouse and turntable, 2250 de la Rotonde Avenue, Charny, Quebec

Saskatchewan

Biggar Roundhouse, built by the Grand Trunk Pacific Railway in 1909, demolished in 2015.

Roundhouse, Prince Albert, Saskatchewan - ten stall roundhouse and turntable, 1550-5 Avenue East. Built by the Canadian Northern Railway, it is still in use by the Carlton Trail Railway.

Chile
 Baquedano semi-circular roundhouse for 16 locos with turntable. Abandoned building claiming to be a museum, but unattended. Has 5 preserved (not restored) steam locomotives in and around the roundhouse, as well as old carriages and wagons. Is in the centre of a working railway yard - Baquedano Station. Site was used in the James Bond movie Quantum of Solace.

France

 Annemasse roundhouse (built in 1880, destroyed in 2017)
 Aubagne roundhouse
  (two side-by-side)
 Bayonne roundhouse
 Bénestroff roundhouse
 Bizanos roundhouse
 Bordeaux roundhouse
 Castelnaudary roundhouse
 Chalindrey roundhouse
  (two side-by-side), built between 1906 and 1910, Chambéry
 Charleville-Mézières Mohon roundhouses (two side-by-side)
 Châtenoy-le-Royal roundhouses (two side-by-side)
 Clermont-Ferrand roundhouse
 Colmar roundhouse
 Damelevieres roundhouse
  (two side-by-side), built between 1906 and 1910, Chambéry
 Dijon roundhouse
 
 
 Longueville roundhouse, Longueville, now the ""
 Lyon roundhouses (three)
  (three)
 Miramas roundhouse
Modane
 
 Montauban roundhouse
 
 Moulins roundhouse
 Mulhouse roundhouse
 Nevers roundhouse
 Nogent-Vincennes roundhouse, built in 1849 in Paris-la Villette depot where it was used until it was disassembled in 1859 and then rebuilt at Nogent-Vincennes depot
 Paris roundhouse
 Perthuis roundhouse (destroyed)
 Saint-Étienne roundhouse
 Strasbourg-Hausbergen roundhouses
 Sarrebourg roundhouse
 Thionville roundhouse
 Toulon roundhouse
 Valence roundhouse
 Valenton roundhouse

Germany
Augsburg, museum
Bamberg: 2 (both half-demolished and in ruins)
Berlin-Pankow-Heinersdorf
Berlin-Rummelsburg
Dresden: 2 (Plauen, Südvorstadt)
Halle (Saale), originally 4, 3 left as one is destroyed in 2017. The one in best condition is now part of the DB Eisenbahn Museum.
Hannover still occasionally used
Neustrelitz
Nürnberg (Bärenschanze): demolished
Ottbergen, no longer rail connected
Rostock
Staßfurt
Wittenberge, ruin

Hungary

Budapest North Depot (now the Hungarian Railway Museum, 2 turntables)
Székesfehérvár (operated by MÁV Hungarian State Railway),
Dombóvár (operated by MÁV Hungarian State Railway),
Szeged Marshalling Yard (operated by MÁV Hungarian State Railway),
Pécs (operated by MÁV Hungarian State Railway),
Ferencváros (operated by MÁV Hungarian State Railway, turntable with square engine shops),
Miskolc Marshalling Yard (operated by MÁV Hungarian State Railway),
...

Indonesia
Indonesian Railway Company have 2 surviving roundhouses as in 2019: the one near Lempuyangan railway station in Yogyakarta and next to Tebing Tinggi station in North Sumatra. Although both no longer functioning as locomotive shed.
Jatibarang Brebes Sugar Mill has a historic roundhouse for their fleet of 600mm locomotives.

Italy
Turin, near Porta Nouva terminal, 2 large roundhouses, one still currently in use by the FS electric locomotive fleet, the other is used as storage for historical equipment, neither accessible to public

Japan
Umekoji Steam Locomotive Museum, Kyoto
Tsuyama Roundhouse, Tsuyama

Mexico
Ferrocarriles Mexicanos yards southwest of downtown, Guadalajara
Ferrocarriles Mexicanos yards, San Luis Potosi

Poland
There are several dozen round houses still in operational use in Poland (albeit for diesel or electric locomotives) each with electric powered turntables. Many also remain extant but unused such as Gnieszno and Bydgoszcz. Below are ones associated with steam preservation.
Roundhouse, Wolsztyn and Leszno, used daily in conjunction with scheduled PKP steam
Okrąglak roundhouse in Piła
Roundhouse Skierniewice
Roundhouse Jaworzna Slaska
Roundhouse Tczew
Roundhouse in Czechowice Dziedzice (PKP Cargo)
Roundhouse Bydgoszcz

Portugal
Entroncamento Municipality Portuguese National Railway Museum
Barreiro "Rotunda das Locomotivas" (Locomotive Roundabout) at the terminal railyard of the Alentejo Railway
Castelo Branco "Rotunda das Locomotivas" (Locomotive Roundabout) at the terminal railyard of the Alentejo Railway

Switzerland
The lok remise at Uster station, Ulster, canton of Zurich

Sri Lanka
Galle Railway Station
Badulla Railway Station

Taiwan

Changhua Roundhouse

United Kingdom

Barrow Hill Engine Shed roundhouse, Derbyshire
North Midland Railway roundhouse, listed building built in 1839, Derby, England
The Roundhouse, Chalk Farm, London, England. Built in 1847, it was too small for its function within 20 years; it now houses an arts centre.
Horsham Motive Power Depot
Roundhouse and half-roundhouse, Wellington Road/Graingers Way, Leeds. Both structures were built in approximately 1847 and are listed buildings; the much larger roundhouse is occupied by a commercial vehicle hire company while the half-roundhouse is currently (May 2021) unoccupied.
St. Blazey engine shed in Cornwall, now on Historic England's Heritage at Risk Register
Sunderland South Dock locomotive depot

United States

Several of the historic roundhouses in the United States are listed on the National Register of Historic Places (NRHP).

Alabama
Alabama Great Southern Railroad Finley Roundhouse, Birmingham, Alabama
Louisville and Nashville Railroad roundhouse, Tarrant, Alabama
Roundhouse, Tuscumbia, Alabama Building and turntable intact in May 2022.

Arizona
Verde Tunnel & Smelter Railroad roundhouse, Clarkdale, Arizona
El Paso and Southwestern Railroad roundhouse, Tucson, Arizona

Arkansas
Hot Springs Railroad Roundhouse, Malvern, listed on the National Register of Historic Places
St. Louis Southwestern Railway roundhouse, Jonesboro, Arkansas
Arkansas Midland RR roundhouse, Malvern, AR, disconnected used for business

California
Southern Pacific Railroad Bayshore roundhouse, Brisbane, California
Railtown 1897 State Historic Park, Jamestown, California, includes a roundhouse 
California State Railroad Museum, Sacramento
Timber Heritage Association is leasing the historic roundhouse and shops built back in the 1890s, Samoa, Humboldt County, California
San Francisco Belt Railroad roundhouse, the Belt Railroad Engine House and Sandhouse, San Francisco, CA, NRHP-listed
Lenzen Roundhouse, originally located in San Jose, California, currently disassembled while the California Trolley and Railroad Corporation searches for new site

Colorado
Midland Terminal Railroad Roundhouse, Colorado Springs, Colorado, NRHP-listed.  Now a retail mail.
Chicago, Rock Island and Pacific Railroad roundhouse, Colorado Springs, Colorado
Como Roundhouse, Railroad Depot and Hotel Complex, Como, Colorado, NRHP-listed
CB&Q/BNSF roundhouse portion, Denver, Colorado, 2 stalls left of old CB&Q roundhouse included as part of current shop building
Durango and Silverton Narrow Gauge Railroad roundhouse, Durango, Colorado
Colorado Railroad Museum roundhouse, Golden, Colorado
Union Pacific roundhouse, Hugo, Colorado
Leadville, Colorado & Southern (D&RGW) roundhouse, Leadville, CO
Tiny Town RR roundhouse & turntable,  Morrison, CO  15" gauge tourist RR

Connecticut
Connecticut Valley Railroad Roundhouse and Turntable Site, Old Saybrook, Connecticut, NRHP-listed
Columbia Junction Roundhouse, Connecticut Eastern RR Museum, Built 11/1892, Razed ~1934, Rebuilt 9/2000, www.cteastrrmuseum.org, Willimantic, Connecticut

Georgia
Southern Railway (U.S.) roundhouse, Peagram Yard, Atlanta, Georgia
Roundhouse at the Georgia State Railroad Museum, formerly the Roundhouse Railroad Museum, Savannah, Georgia, NRHP-listed

Hawaii
Roundhouse of the Hawaii Consolidated Railway, Hilo, listed in 2005 among most endangered historic sites in Hawaii
Roundhouse of the Kahului Railroad, Kahului, Maui, located at 140 Hobron Ave

Illinois
Chicago, Burlington, & Quincy Roundhouse and Locomotive Shop, also known as Two Brothers Roundhose, Aurora, Illinois, NRHP-listed
Chicago, Burlington and Quincy Railroad roundhouse, Beardstown, Illinois
Roundhouse, Centralia, Illinois
Chicago and North Western Railway roundhouse, Chicago, Illinois
Roundhouse, South Deering, Illinois
roundhouse, Missouri Pacific Villa Grove, IL, still standing in 10/16

Indiana
Roundhouse, Frankfort, Indiana
Roundhouse, Gary, Indiana
Indiana Harbor Belt Railroad, Gibson Roundhouse, Hammond, Indiana
Southern Railway (U.S.) roundhouse, Princeton, Indiana down to a 1/4 when abandoned in 1958, mostly rotted away by 2/18
roundhouse, Evansville, IN

Iowa
Chicago and North Western Transportation Company roundhouse, Council Bluffs, Iowa
Burlington, Cedar Rapids and Northern Railway roundhouse, Iowa City, Iowa
Chicago, Rock Island and Pacific Railroad roundhouse, Manly, Iowa
Chicago, Milwaukee, St. Paul and Pacific Railroad roundhouse, Nahant, Iowa
Chicago, Milwaukee, St. Paul and Pacific Railroad roundhouse, North Sioux City, Iowa, now Siouxland Historical Railroad Museum
Illinois Central Railroad roundhouse, Waterloo, Iowa
Chicago & Northwestern roundhouse (small portion), Cedar Rapids

Kansas
Chicago, Rock Island and Pacific Railroad roundhouse, Phillipsburg, Kansas, now Kyle Railroad

Kentucky
Roundhouse, Covington, Kentucky
Kentucky & Indiana Bridge Company roundhouse, Louisville, Kentucky

Louisiana
Southern Pacific Railroad Roundhouse and Yard, Lafayette, Louisiana
New Orleans Public Belt Railroad Roundhouse, New Orleans, Louisiana

Maine
Maine Central Railroad Company roundhouse, Calais, Maine
Roundhouse, Derby, Maine
Bangor and Aroostook Railroad roundhouse, Caribou, Maine
Grand Trunk Railway roundhouse, East Deering, Maine
Bangor and Aroostook Railroad roundhouse, Millinocket, Maine
Roundhouse, Northern Maine Junction, Maine
Sandy River and Rangeley Lakes Railroad roundhouse, Phillips, Maine
Rockland Turntable and Engine House, a roundhouse of the Maine Central Railroad Company, Rockland, ME, NRHP-listed
Maine Central Railroad Company roundhouse, Rumford, Maine
Roundhouse ruins at Conway Junction Railroad Turntable Site, South Berwick, ME, NRHP-listed
Maine Central Railroad Company roundhouse, Waterville, Maine

Maryland
Mt Clare Roundhouse, Baltimore, Maryland, which contains the B&O Railroad Museum
Baltimore and Ohio Railroad Cumberland Roundhouse, Cumberland, Maryland, still in use by CSX as a locomotive shop
Maryland and pennsylvania roundhouse, E of Druid Lake, Baltimore, MD

Massachusetts
Roundhouse, Athol, Massachusetts
Roundhouse, Hyannis, Massachusetts
Roundhouse, E. Deerfield, MA
roundhouse, N. of Chester, MA
Roundhouse, Revere, MA

Michigan

Lake Shore and Michigan Southern Roundhouse, Adrian, Michigan
Detroit and Mackinac Roundhouse, Alpena, Michigan
Calumet and Hecla Roundhouse, Calumet Michigan
Detroit, Toledo & Milwaukee Roundhouse, a 2000 replica of an 1884 roundhouse at Greenfield Village, Dearborn, Michigan, which in 2000 was one of only seven working roundhouses open to the public in the U.S.
Quincy and Torch Lake, Hancock Michigan
Pere Marquette Roundhouse, New Buffalo, Michigan
Michigan Central Railroad Roundhouse, Niles, Michigan
Port Huron & Detroit Railroad Roundhouse, Port Huron, Michigan
Pere Marquette Roundhouse, Saginaw, Michigan

Minnesota
Great Northern Railway roundhouse, Breckenridge, Minnesota
Minneapolis, St. Paul and Sault Ste. Marie Railroad roundhouse, Minneapolis, Minnesota
Duluth Missabe & Northern Railway roundhouse, Proctor, Minnesota
Duluth, Missabe and Iron Range Railway roundhouse, Proctor, Minnesota
Jackson Street Roundhouse, Saint Paul, Minnesota
Roundhouse, Minnesota Commercial Railway, St. Paul, Minnesota
Minneapolis, St. Paul and Sault Ste. Marie Railroad roundhouse, Thief River Falls, Minnesota
Chicago, Milwaukee, St. Paul and Pacific Railroad roundhouse, Wabasha, Minnesota
Roundhouse, Chicago, Milwaukee, St. Paul and Pacific Railroad (Pigs Eye yard, St. Paul, Minnesota)
Soo roundhouse, 5 stall, Rollag, MN

Mississippi
Columbus and Greenville Railway roundhouse, Columbus, Mississippi
Illinois Central Railroad roundhouse, Jackson, Mississippi

Missouri
Roundhouse, Joplin, Missouri
Kansas City Terminal Railway Company Roundhouse Historic District, Kansas City, MO, NRHP-listed
Roundhouse, Steelville, Missouri

Montana
Butte, Anaconda and Pacific Railway roundhouse, Anaconda, Montana
Great Northern Railway (U.S.) roundhouse, Butte, Montana
Roundhouse, Glendive, Montana
Chicago, Milwaukee, St. Paul and Pacific Railroad roundhouse, Harlowton, Montana
Great Northern Railway (U.S.) roundhouse, Whitefish, Montana

Nebraska
Roundhouse BNSF McCook, Nebraska; turntable demolished
Roundhouse (portion) BNSF, Holdredge, NE; no turntable
Roundhouse (portion) BNSF, W. Lincoln, NE
Roundhouse (split 1/2 circle), BNSF, Chadron, NE

New Hampshire
Conway Scenic Railroad roundhouse, North Conway, New Hampshire
Boston & Maine Railroad roundhouse, West Lebanon, New Hampshire
Boston and Maine Corporation roundhouse, Dover, New Hampshire
Boston and Maine Corporation roundhouse, Walpole, New Hampshire
Bartlett Roundhouse, Bartlett, NH, NRHP-listed, a Portland and Ogdensburg RR roundhouse
Boston & Maine 2 stalls of original roundhouse Nashua, NH
Boston & Maine full Roundhouse saved and incorporated into retail complex Keene, NH

New Jersey
Central Railroad of New Jersey roundhouse, Cranford, New Jersey
New York, Susquehanna and Western Railway roundhouse, Hawthorne, New Jersey
Lehigh valley/Nolfolk Southern roundhouse and turntable, Newark, new jersey

New Mexico
Roundhouse at Santa Fe Railway Shops (Albuquerque): at least there once was a roundhouse there (current status unclear). Edit 8/19/2019 According to the latest Google map, the turntable exists but the building is gone. 
Atchison, Topeka and Santa Fe Railway roundhouse, the AT & SF Roundhouse, Las Vegas, New Mexico, NRHP-listed
Cumbres & Toltec Scenic RR (D&RG) roundhouse, two stalls of original

New York
Roundhouse, Batavia, New York
Roundhouse, Binghamton, New York
NY Central Railroad Roundhouse, Buffalo, New York
Roundhouse, Manchester, New York
Roundhouse, Richmond Hill, New York
Pennsylvania Railroad Shops & Roundhouse, West Seneca, New York
New York Central System roundhouse, Rouses Point, NY
New York Central System roundhouse, Utica, NY
roundhouse, Woodlawn, NY (Buffalo area)
roundhouse, Sloan, NY (Buffalo area)
roundhouse, Retsof, NY 4/16 aerial shows working
roundhouse, Rochester, NY B&O/NYC, disconnected but goes back to 1800s
roundhouse, Auburn, NY Lehigh Valley RR
roundhouse, Olean, NY Erie RR, disconnected 1/4 circle

North Carolina
Norfolk Southern Roundhouse, Asheville, NC, demolished due to unsafe conditions
Raleigh - Gaston Roundhouse, Raleigh, NC; building demolished, but turntable remains
Spencer Shops Roundhouse at North Carolina Transportation Museum

North Dakota
Great Northern Railway (U.S.) roundhouse, Grand Forks, North Dakota: once full circle, most stalls demolished (foundations remain). Turntable and some stalls still in use.
Great Northern Railway (U.S.) roundhouse, Fargo, North Dakota; semi-circular roundhouse building & turntable demolished, but turntable & roundhouse foundation remains visible

Ohio
Pennsylvania Railroad roundhouse, Ashtabula, Ohio
Pennsylvania Railroad roundhouse, Crestline, Ohio; Roundhouse and turntable demolished, but foundations and backshops remain
Roundhouse, Bellevue, Ohio
Midwest Railway Preservation Society roundhouse, Cleveland, Ohio, former Baltimore and Ohio Railroad facility
Chesapeake and Ohio Railway roundhouse, Parsons Yard, Columbus, Ohio
Age of Steam Roundhouse, Sugarcreek, Ohio

Pennsylvania
East Altoona Roundhouse, Altoona, Pennsylvania largest locomotive servicing roundhouse in the world in 1904; demolished in two phases in the 1960s
Roundhouse, Chambersburg, Pennsylvania
Roundhouse, Enola Yard, Enola, Pennsylvania
Roundhouse, Hazelwood, Pennsylvania
Roundhouse, now used by Waste Management, Pen Argyl, Pennsylvania
East Broad Top Railroad roundhouse, Rockhill, Pennsylvania
Steamtown National Historic Site, the former Scranton, Pennsylvania yards of the Delaware, Lackawanna and Western Railroad
Roundhouse, North Bessemer, Pennsylvania
Roundhouse, Hall, Pennsylvania
Roundhouse, Greenville, Pennsylvania
Roundhouse, New Castle, Pennsylvania
Roundhouse, McKeesport, PA Roundhouse (no turntable) and machine shop
Roundhouse, Mahoningtown, PA small roundhouse used for commercial business
Roundhouse, North Pittston, PA  Roundhouse remains

Rhode Island
Narragansett Pier Railroad roundhouse, Peace Dale, Rhode Island

South Dakota
Chicago, Milwaukee, St. Paul and Pacific Railroad roundhouse, Aberdeen, South Dakota; Currently 7 stalls, 22 stalls demolished (foundations visible), turntable demolished.
Chicago and North Western Roundhouse, Huron, SD, NRHP-listed, now belonging to Rapid City, Pierre and Eastern Railroad; Once full circle, 15 stalls and the turntable remain.
Black Hills and Fort Pierre Railroad roundhouse, Lead, South Dakota; Converted into restaurant.
Prairie Village Museum roundhouse, Madison, South Dakota
Roundhouse, Rapid City, South Dakota; 4 Stalls, no turntable

Tennessee
Roundhouse, Bruceton, Tennessee
Southern Railway Roundhouse, Knoxville, Tennessee
CSX (ex L&N) Radnor Yard, Nashville, Tennessee

Texas
San Antonio, Texas, turntable without roundhouse remains southwest of Duval & Hackberry Streets
Cotton Belt Roundhouse, Texarkana, Texas in private hands, turntable gone
CB&Q roundhouse, Amarillo, TX disconnected in the 1960s, now commercial property
Mineola Texas roundhouse

Vermont
Vermont Railway Headquarters, located in the former Rutland Railroad's roundhouse, Burlington, Vermont
Central Vermont Railway roundhouse, Saint Albans, Vermont
Central Vermont Railway roundhouse, White River Junction, Vermont A replica as the original destroyed by fire
Central Vermont Railway roundhouse, Newport, Vermont

Virginia
L&N Railway 8 stall roundhouse, Bristol, VA disconnected, used for commercial business
NS railway  2 standing roundhouses, Roanoke, VA
CSX roundhouse, Norfolk, VA

Washington
BNSF Railway Interbay Roundhouse, at Balmer Yard, Seattle, Washington
Roundhouse, Shelton, Washington
roundhouses Chehalis, WA 1 Central WA RR; other Great Northern (source - aerial pic)

West Virginia
B&O Martinsburg West Roundhouse, the oldest covered turntable in the U.S., included in Baltimore and Ohio Railroad Martinsburg Shops, Martinsburg, WV, NRHP-listed
Norfolk and Western Railroad Williamson Roundhouse, a 21-stall roundhouse, Williamson, West Virginia, owned by Norfolk Southern Railway and used as a car shop

Wisconsin
Wisconsin and Southern Railroad roundhouse, Janesville, Wisconsin
Chicago and North Western Railroad roundhouse, Madison, Wisconsin
Roundhouse, North Fond du Lac, Wisconsin
Roundhouse, Spooner, Wisconsin
Roundhouse, Superior, Wisconsin
Roundhouse, Wisconsin Rapids, Wisconsin

Wyoming
Union Pacific Roundhouse, Turntable and Machine Shop, Cheyenne, Wyoming, NRHP-listed, now part of the Wyoming Transportation Museum
Roundhouse (1912) with 28 stalls, at Union Pacific Railroad Complex, Evanston, Wyoming, NRHP-listed
Chicago and North Western Transportation Company roundhouse, Lusk, Wyoming

References

Roundhouses